Tahoe City (formerly Tahoe) is an unincorporated town in Placer County, California. Tahoe City is located on the shore of Lake Tahoe, at the outlet of the Truckee River.

The site was surveyed in 1863, and Tahoe House was built in 1864. The Tahoe post office opened in 1871, closed for a period in 1896, and changed its name to Tahoe City in 1949. The ZIP Code is 96145. For statistical purposes, Tahoe City is included in the Sunnyside-Tahoe City census-designated place (CDP).

Climate
Due to its high elevation, Tahoe City has a continental mediterranean climate (Köppen Dsb) with dry summers featuring very warm days and cool nights, plus chilly winters with regular snowfall. As a comparison, higher, colder, but drier Bodie has a mean maximum snow depth of only  – three-fifths that of Tahoe City.

During summer, Tahoe City is generally dry; though thunderstorms may bring rain to the region.

See also
 Sunnyside-Tahoe City, California (CDP)
 Watson Log Cabin
 UC Davis Tahoe Environmental Research Center (TERC)

References

External links 
 

Unincorporated communities in Placer County, California
Lake Tahoe
Populated places in the Sierra Nevada (United States)
Populated places established in 1863
1863 establishments in California
Unincorporated communities in California